Charlotte Sally Potter  (born 19 September 1949) is an English film director and screenwriter. She is known for directing Orlando (1992), which won the audience prize for Best Film at the Venice Film Festival.

Early life
Potter was born and raised in London. Her mother was a music teacher and her father was an interior designer and a poet. Her younger brother Nic became the bassist for the rock group Van der Graaf Generator. When asked about her background, which influenced her work as a filmmaker, she responds, "I came from an atheist background and an anarchist background, which meant that I grew up in an environment that was full of questions, where nothing could be taken for granted."

When asked about what she learned about filmmaking from trying to do it as a seventeen-year-old woman in the UK in the 60s, Potter laughs.You know, most kinds of securities are illusions, and we need to kind of duck and weave as filmmakers, go with the flow, go where the harvest is. [...] I knew very early on, if I waited for somebody to give me money to do something, I’d never do anything.

Career
Potter began making amateur films at age 14, using an 8mm camera given to her by an uncle. She eventually dropped out of school at age 16 to pursue filmmaking. From 1968–1970 she worked as a kitchen worker and a picture researcher for BBC in order to support herself and her work. She had joined the London Film-Makers' Co-op and began making experimental short films, including Jerk (1969) and Play (1970). She later trained as a dancer and choreographer at the London School of Contemporary Dance. She made both film and dance pieces, including Combines (1972), before founding Limited Dance Company with Jacky Lansley.

Potter became an award-winning performance artist and theatre director, with shows including Mounting, Death and the Maiden and Berlin. In addition, she was a member of several music bands (including Feminist Improvising Group and The Film Music Orchestra) working as a lyricist and singer. She collaborated (as a singer-songwriter) with composer Lindsay Cooper on the song cycle Oh Moscow, which was performed throughout Europe, Russia and North America in the late 1980s and commercially released.

Potter continued as a composer when she collaborated with David Motion on the soundtrack to Orlando. She wrote the score for the film, The Tango Lesson, for which she sang "I am You" in the final scene. Her most recent music work is as producer and co-composer with Fred Frith of the original tracks for Yes and Rage.

Referring to her career as a choreographer, Potter said, "Choreography was the perfect 'poor theatre.' All you needed were willing bodies and some space. So it was as a choreographer that I learnt how to direct and it was as a dancer that I learnt how to work."

Potter returned to filmmaking with her short film Thriller (1979), which was a hit on the international festival circuit. This was followed by her first feature film, The Gold Diggers (1983), starring Julie Christie. She directed another short film, The London Story (1986); a documentary series for Channel 4, Tears, Laughter, Fear and Rage (1986); and I am an Ox, I am a Horse, I am a Man, I am a Woman (1988), a film about women in Soviet cinema.

As director of the internationally distributed Orlando (1992), Potter received greater appreciation for her writing and direction. Starring Tilda Swinton, the film was based on Virginia Woolf's novel by the same name and adapted for the screen by Potter. In addition to two Academy Award nominations, Orlando won more than 25 international awards, including the Felix, awarded by the European Film Academy for the best Young European Film of 1993; and first prizes at St Petersburg, Thessaloniki and other European festivals.

The novel had previously been considered impossible to adapt for the screen, because it took place over 400 years and followed a character whose sex changes from a man to a woman. Funding the feature proved difficult, and Orlando took seven years to complete. Filming and editing took 20 weeks. Preparation for the film, including adapting the novel, funding the film, scouting locations, etc., took four years.

When asked whether she thought she would continue to work on feminist themes, Potter replied:
I have come to the conclusion that I can't use that term in my work. Not because of a disavowal of the underlying principles that gave birth to that word – the commitment to liberation, dignity, equality. But it has become a trigger word that stops people's thinking. You literally see people's eyes glaze over with exhaustion when the word flashes into the conversation.

She next directed the film, The Tango Lesson (1996), in which she also performed with renowned dancer Pablo Veron. First presented at the Venice Film Festival, the film was awarded the Ombú de Oro for Best Film at the Mar del Plata Film Festival, Argentina; the SADAIC Great Award from the Sociedad Argentina de Autores y Compositores de Música; as well as receiving Best Film nominations from BAFTA and the US National Board of Review. The Tango Lesson is semi-autobiographical, based on Potter's experiences learning Argentinian Tango with Veron while writing the screenplay for Rage.

The Tango Lesson marks Potter's first time performing on screen. Regarding this decision she stated, "I knew that I had to perform in this one because the impetus for the film came out of my own desire to dance." Potter's professional collaborations with Pablo Veron continue in The Man Who Cried and the stage production of Carmen (2007).

Since The Tango Lesson's release, Potter continued to receive letters from viewers who felt touched by it. In a 2005 interview with FF2 Media's Jan Lisa Huttner, Potter suggests, "I think maybe I’m not the best person to analyze it, but what people pick up on is the passion behind the film: the passion to make the film itself, the passion to dance again. At the age of 46 I put myself in a movie, dancing the Tango with the best tango dancer in the world. [...] It was so terrifying, and so driven by passion at the same time, maybe that’s partly what people respond to.”

The Man Who Cried (starring Johnny Depp, Christina Ricci, Cate Blanchett and John Turturro), premiered at the Venice Film Festival in 2000. Ricci plays a Jewish girl who, separated from her father when she was young in Soviet Russia, travels to America to find him.

It was followed by Yes (2004), with Joan Allen, Simon Abkarian and Sam Neill. Yes was written in response to the attacks in the United States of 11 September 2001; it is considered Potter's return to more experimental methods of filmmaking. The screenplay is written in verse and the film's budget was much smaller than that for The Man Who Cried. Regarding the film's budget and stylistic approaches, Potter said:

Originally I was trying to figure out how we could shoot this film without any lights, because there didn't seem to be enough money in the budget to have any. One solution was to shoot at six frames a second, or even three. Later you print each frame four (or eight) times to bring it into sync at twenty-four frames per second. You can shoot almost in the dark, and still see people's faces ... we did some tests and found that it was very beautiful; so I decided to make it part of the language of the film.

In 2007 Potter directed Georges Bizet's Carmen for English National Opera at the London Coliseum, starring Alice Coote and designed by Es Devlin.

Rage (2009) was the first feature ever to premiere on cell-phones. The cast includes Judi Dench, Steve Buscemi, Lily Cole and Jude Law. Rage was in competition at the Berlin Film Festival in 2009 and nominated for a WEBBY for Best Drama in 2010.

Potter's seventh feature film entitled Ginger & Rosa was written and directed by Potter and produced by Christoper Sheppard and Andrew Lityin. The film starred Elle Fanning and Alice Englert as the title characters and received its premiere at the Telluride Film Festival. The film went into limited release in the UK in 2012 before enjoying a limited run in North America in early 2013.

In 2017, Potter's black comedy The Party was released. It was selected to compete for the Golden Bear in the main competition section of the 67th Berlin International Film Festival and was awarded the Guild Film Prize. The film features a star-studded ensemble cast with Patricia Clarkson, Bruno Ganz, Emily Mortimer, Cherry Jones, Cillian Murphy, Kristin Scott Thomas and Timothy Spall.

In 2020, Potter's drama The Roads Not Taken was released after a world premiere at the Berlin International Film Festival, where it was nominated for the Golden Bear. It follows Molly (Elle Fanning) caring for her father, Leo (Javier Bardem), who suffers from early-onset dementia. In an interview at Berlinale, Potter described the research process involved in providing an accurate and sensitive portrayal of Leo's illness:Although my brother had a variant of it and I had already done a lot of research into it, I consulted a neurologist to make sure that everything was clinically correct. Javier Bardem also did his own research and visited a clinic for people with that particular variant of dementia. And he discovered what I knew, that it can take so many different forms and pathways. Most people think dementia is Alzheimer’s, but Alzheimer’s is just one variation of dementia.

Filmography

Feature films

Shorts

Documentaries

Awards and honors 

Sally Potter had career retrospectives of her film and video work at the BFI Southbank, London, and Filmoteca, Madrid, in 2009, and MoMA, New York, in 2010.
She was appointed Officer of the Order of the British Empire (OBE) in the 2012 Birthday Honours for services to film.

References

Further reading
 Fowler, Catherine. Sally Potter. Chicago: University of Illinois Press (2009). 
Mayer, Sophie. The Cinema of Sally Potter: A Politics of Love. London: Wallflower Press (2009). 
Potter, Sally. Naked Cinema: Working with Actors. Faber and Faber (2014). 
Potter, Sally. Orlando. London: Faber and Faber (1994). 
Potter, Sally. The Tango Lesson. London: Faber and Faber (1997). 
Potter, Sally. Yes: Screenplay and Notes. New York: Newmarket Press (2005).

External links
 Official site, blog and message board
 The Sally Potter Archive

 
 An interview with director Sally Potter, guernicamag.com, interview, October 2005
 Carmen, English National Opera (ENO) site
 Official Rage Site Official Rage Website
 Literature on Sally Potter
 Sally Potter: Biography, nytimes.com
 The Tango Lesson Soundtrack
 MoMA Sally Potter film exhibits

1949 births
English film directors
English screenwriters
English-language film directors
British film producers
Living people
European Film Awards winners (people)
Officers of the Order of the British Empire
British women screenwriters
British women film directors
Tango film directors